Open-mindedness is receptiveness to new ideas. Open-mindedness relates to the way in which people approach the views and knowledge of others." Jason Baehr defines an open-minded person as one who "characteristically moves beyond or temporarily sets aside his own  doxastic commitments in order to give a fair and impartial hearing to the intellectual opposition".  Jack Kwong's definition sees open-mindedness as the "willingness to take a novel viewpoint seriously". 

According to Wayne Riggs, open-mindedness springs from an awareness of the inherent fallibility of one's beliefs; hence, open-minded individuals are more inclined to listen to, and seriously consider, alternative viewpoints.

There are various scales for the measurement of open-mindedness. Harding and Hare have argued that schools should emphasize open-mindedness more than relativism in their  science instruction, because the scientific community does not embrace a relativistic way of thinking.

Among other things, the critical attitude involves an open-minded outlook with respect to one's beliefs.

Open-mindedness  is generally considered an important personal attribute for effective participation in management teams and other  groups. Open-mindedness is usually encouraged in group settings, within different cultures and new environments. According to David DiSalvo, closed-mindedness, or an unwillingness to consider new ideas, can result from the brain's natural dislike for ambiguity. According to this view, the brain has a "search and destroy" relationship with ambiguity and evidence contradictory to people's current beliefs tends to make them uncomfortable by introducing such ambiguity. Research confirms that belief-discrepant-closed-minded persons have less tolerance for cognitive inconsistency.

Virtues contrasting with open-mindedness include steadfastness, loyalty, and fundamentalism.

See also 
Openness to experience
 Filter bubble
Belief perseverance
Rationality

References

Further reading

 Mather Jr., F. J. (1919). “The Inside of the Open Mind,” The Unpopular Review, Vol. XII, No. 23.

Mental states
Belief